Millhurst may refer to:
Millhurst, Edmonton, Canada
Millhurst, New Jersey, United States